The 2019 Ferrari Challenge Asia-Pacific is the 9th season of Ferrari Challenge Asia-Pacific. The season consisted of 7 rounds, starting at the Melbourne Grand Prix Circuit on March 15 and ending at the Mugello Circuit on October 27.

Calendar

Entry list
All teams and drivers used the Ferrari 488 Challenge fitted with Pirelli tyres.

Trofeo Pirelli

Coppa Shell

Results and standings

Race results

Championship standings
Points were awarded to the top ten classified finishers as follows:

Trofeo Pirelli

Coppa Shell

See also
 2019 Finali Mondiali

References

External links
 Official website

Asia-Pacific 2019
Ferrari Challenge Asia-Pacific